Ghiasabad (also Romanized as Ghīās̄ābād; also known as Ghīās̄ābād-e Bālā) is a village in Neyasar Rural District, Neyasar District, Kashan County, Isfahan Province, Iran. At the 2006 census, its population was 224, in 71 families.

References 

Populated places in Kashan County